Sharkey County is a county located in the U.S. state of Mississippi. Part of the western border is formed by the Yazoo River.  According to the 2020 census, the population was 3,800, making it the second-least populous county in Mississippi. Its county seat is Rolling Fork. The county is named after William L. Sharkey, the provisional Governor of Mississippi in 1865.

Sharkey County is located in the Mississippi Delta region.

Geography

Major highways
  U.S. Route 61
  Mississippi Highway 14
  Mississippi Highway 16

Adjacent counties
 Washington County (north)
 Humphreys County (northeast)
 Yazoo County (east)
 Issaquena County (southwest)

National protected area
 Delta National Forest
 Theodore Roosevelt National Wildlife Refuge (part)

Demographics

2020 census

As of the 2020 United States Census, there were 3,800 people, 1,751 households, and 1,046 families residing in the county.

2010 census
As of the 2010 United States Census, there were 4,916 people living in the county. 71.0% were Black or African American, 27.9% White, 0.2% Asian, 0.1% Native American, 0.4% of some other race and 0.4% or two or more races. 0.8% were Hispanic or Latino (of any race).

2000 census
As of the census of 2000, there were 6,580 people, 2,163 households, and 1,589 families living in the county.  The population density was 15 people per square mile (6/km2).  There were 2,416 housing units at an average density of 6 per square mile (2/km2).  The racial makeup of the county was 69.32% Black or African American, 29.36% White, 0.18% Native American, 0.27% Asian, 0.27% from other races, and 0.59% from two or more races.  1.31% of the population were Hispanic or Latino of any race.

There were 2,163 households, out of which 36.10% had children under the age of 18 living with them, 40.00% were married couples living together, 26.80% had a female householder with no husband present, and 26.50% were non-families. 23.50% of all households were made up of individuals, and 9.90% had someone living alone who was 65 years of age or older.  The average household size was 2.99 and the average family size was 3.56.

In the county, the population was spread out, with 33.00% under the age of 18, 10.40% from 18 to 24, 24.80% from 25 to 44, 20.40% from 45 to 64, and 11.30% who were 65 years of age or older.  The median age was 31 years. For every 100 females there were 88.70 males.  For every 100 females age 18 and over, there were 82.40 males.

The median income for a household in the county was $22,285, and the median income for a family was $26,786. Males had a median income of $26,563 versus $17,931 for females. The per capita income for the county was $11,396.  About 30.50% of families and 38.30% of the population were below the poverty line, including 50.00% of those under age 18 and 24.20% of those age 65 or over.

Sharkey County has the tenth-lowest per capita income in Mississippi and the 73rd lowest in the United States.

Education
 Public School Districts
 South Delta School District, which operates South Delta High School
 Private Schools
 Sharkey-Issaquena Academy (Rolling Fork)

Communities

City
 Rolling Fork (county seat)

Towns
 Anguilla
 Cary

Census-designated places
 Delta City
 Nitta Yuma
 Panther Burn

Unincorporated communities
 Egremont
 Lorenzen
 Onward
 Patmos

Politics
Sharkey County is, like the rest of the Mississippi Delta region, heavily Democratic. It has voted for the Democratic nominee for president in every election since 1976, and no Republican has broken 40% of the vote since George H. W. Bush in 1988.

See also
 National Register of Historic Places listings in Sharkey County, Mississippi

References

External links
 

 
Mississippi counties
1876 establishments in Mississippi
Populated places established in 1876
Black Belt (U.S. region)
Majority-minority counties in Mississippi